This list is of the Historic Sites of Japan located within the Prefecture of Yamanashi.

National Historic Sites
As of 1 June 2022, sixteen Sites have been designated as being of national significance, including Mount Fuji, which spans the prefectural borders with Shizuoka.

Prefectural Historic Sites
As of 1 April 2022, twenty-eight Sites have been designated as being of prefectural importance.

Municipal Historic Sites
As of 1 May 2021, a further one hundred and ninety-six Sites have been designated as being of municipal importance.

Registered Historic Sites
As of 17 June 2022, one Monument has been registered (as opposed to designated) as an Historic Site at a national level.

See also

 Cultural Properties of Japan
 Kai Province
 List of Places of Scenic Beauty of Japan (Yamanashi)
 Yamanashi Prefectural Museum
 List of Cultural Properties of Japan - paintings (Yamanashi)

References

External links
  Cultural Properties of Yamanashi Prefecture
  Historic Sites of Yamanashi Prefecture

Yamanashi Prefecture
 Yamanashi